Lake Leon, also known as Tom Brown Park Pond, is a small lake on the eastern side of Tallahassee, Florida, United States. Located within Tom Brown Park, there is a nature trail around the lake, with a boardwalk along one side.

Geography 
Lake Leon has a maximum lake depth of 11 feet. Its average depth is estimated to be 6 feet.

References

Lakes of Leon County, Florida
Lakes of Florida